The 1910 Cleveland Naps season was a season in American baseball. It involved the Cleveland Naps finishing fifth in the American League.

Regular season 
 August 30, 1910: Tom Hughes threw what would have been the first no-hitter in New York Highlanders history against the Naps, but the game was tied at 0–0 after nine innings. Cleveland got their first hit in the 10th, then scored five runs in the 11th inning to beat New York by a score of 5–0.

Season standings

Record vs. opponents

Roster

Player stats

Batting

Starters by position 
Note: Pos = Position; G = Games played; AB = At bats; H = Hits; Avg. = Batting average; HR = Home runs; RBI = Runs batted in

Other batters 
Note: G = Games played; AB = At bats; H = Hits; Avg. = Batting average; HR = Home runs; RBI = Runs batted in

Pitching

Starting pitchers 
Note: G = Games pitched; IP = Innings pitched; W = Wins; L = Losses; ERA = Earned run average; SO = Strikeouts

Other pitchers 
Note: G = Games pitched; IP = Innings pitched; W = Wins; L = Losses; ERA = Earned run average; SO = Strikeouts

Relief pitchers 
Note: G = Games pitched; W = Wins; L = Losses; SV = Saves; ERA = Earned run average; SO = Strikeouts

Notes

References 
1910 Cleveland Naps season at Baseball Reference

Cleveland Guardians seasons
Cleveland Naps season
1910 in sports in Ohio